Léa Barbeau (born 20 October 2000) is a French professional squash player. She achieved her highest career PSA ranking of 115 in May 2021 during the 2020-21 PSA World Tour.

References

External links 
 
 

2000 births
Living people
French female squash players
People from La Roche-sur-Yon
Sportspeople from Vendée
21st-century French women